Nipponotrophon barbarae is a species of sea snail, a marine gastropod mollusk, in the family Muricidae, the murex snails or rock snails.

Distribution

References

barbarae
Gastropods described in 2016